Hieroglyphus is a genus of grasshoppers in the family Acrididae: subfamily Hemiacridinae and the tribe Hieroglyphini Bolívar, 1912. Species can be found in Africa and Asia.

Species
The Orthoptera Species File lists the following:
Hieroglyphus acuticercus Kumar & Usmani, 2015 - India
Hieroglyphus africanus Uvarov, 1922 - Sahel
Hieroglyphus akbari Riffat & Wagan, 2012 - Pakistan
Hieroglyphus annulicornis Shiraki, 1910 - India, Viet Nam, Taiwan
Hieroglyphus banian Fabricius, 1798 - India, Viet Nam
Hieroglyphus concolor Walker, 1870 - India, Indo-China
Hieroglyphus daganensis Krauss, 1877 - type species - Sahel
Hieroglyphus kolhapurnesis Swaminathan, Swaminathan & Nagar, 2017 - India
Hieroglyphus indicus Mason, 1973 - India
Hieroglyphus nigrorepletus Bolívar, 1912 - India
Hieroglyphus oryzivorus Carl, 1916 - India
Hieroglyphus perpolita Uvarov, 1933 - Pakistan
Hieroglyphus tonkinensis Bolívar, 1912 - Indo-China, eastern China

Gallery

References

External links
 
 
 

Acrididae genera
Caelifera